Eltanin Bay is a bay in Antarctica about  wide in the southern Bellingshausen Sea that indents the coast of Ellsworth Land west of the Wirth Peninsula. It was mapped by the United States Geological Survey from surveys and U.S. Navy air photos, 1961–66, and was named by the Advisory Committee on Antarctic Names for the United States Antarctic Research Program oceanographic research ship Eltanin which made numerous research cruises in the South Pacific Ocean.

See also 
Alison Ice Stream

References 

Bays of Ellsworth Land